The 1988 Brisbane Rugby League premiership was the 67th season of Brisbane's semi-professional rugby league football competition. Eight teams from across Brisbane competed for the premiership, which culminated in a grand final match between the Valleys-Tweed and Ipswich clubs.

Season summary 
A new team, the Logan Scorpions, were admitted to the competition, bringing its total to ten teams. Teams played each other three times, with 21 rounds of competition played. It resulted in a top five of Souths, Easts, Valleys-Tweed and Ipswich.

Teams

Ladder 

Source:

Finals 

Source:

References

Rugby league in Brisbane
Brisbane Rugby League season